The communauté de communes du Pays de la Faïence de Desvres  is a former communauté de communes in the Pas-de-Calais département and in the Nord-Pas-de-Calais region of France. It was created in January 1996. It was merged into the new Communauté de communes de Desvres-Samer in January 2009.

Composition 
This Communauté de communes comprised 23 communes:

Alincthun
Bellebrune
Belle-et-Houllefort
Bournonville
Brunembert
Colembert
Courset
Crémarest
Desvres
Doudeauville
Henneveux
Le Wast
Longfossé
Longueville
Lottinghen
Menneville
Nabringhen
Quesques
Saint-Martin-Choquel
Selles
Senlecques
Vieil-Moutier
Wirwignes

See also
Communes of the Pas-de-Calais department

References 

Desvres